Eurytaphria is a genus of moths in the family Geometridae first described by Warren in 1893.

Species
Eurytaphria undilineata Warren, 1893 Sikkim in India
Eurytaphria xanthoperata Hampson, 1896 India, Sri Lanka, Bali
Eurytaphria bisinuata Hampson, 1895 northeastern Himalayas
Eurytaphria punctilineata (Hampson, 1895) southern India, Sri Lanka
Eurytaphria chlorochroa (Meyrick, 1897) Borneo, Sumatra, Bali
Eurytaphria melinau Holloway, 1993 Borneo

References

Baptini